The Association for Women in Mathematics (AWM) is a professional society whose mission is to encourage women and girls to study and to have active careers in the mathematical sciences, and to promote equal opportunity for and the equal treatment of women and girls in the mathematical sciences. The AWM was founded in 1971 and incorporated in the state of Massachusetts.  AWM has approximately 5200 members, including over 250 institutional members, such as colleges, universities, institutes, and mathematical societies.  It offers numerous programs and workshops to mentor women and girls in the mathematical sciences.  Much of AWM's work is supported through federal grants.

History
The Association was founded in 1971 as the Association of Women Mathematicians, but the name was changed almost immediately.  As reported in "A Brief History of the Association for Women in Mathematics: The Presidents' Perspectives", by Lenore Blum:

Mary Gray, an early organizer and first president, placed an advertisement in the February 1971 Notices of the AMS, and wrote the first issue of the AWM Newsletter that May.  Early goals of the association focused on equal pay for equal work, as well as equal consideration for admission to graduate school and support while there; for faculty appointments at all levels; for promotion and for tenure; for administrative appointments; and for government grants, positions on review and advisory panels and positions in professional organizations.  Alice T. Shafer, who succeeded Mary Gray as second president of the AWM, set up an AWM office at Wellesley College. At this point, AWM began to be a recognized established presence in the mathematics scene.

The AWM holds an annual meeting at the Joint Mathematics Meetings.  In 2011, during its fortieth-anniversary celebration 40 Years and Counting, the association initiated a biennial research symposium.

The Association for Women in Mathematics Newsletter is the member journal of the organization.  The first issue was published in May 1971, a few months after AWM was founded.  All regular members of AWM can request that hard copies of the newsletter be sent to them.  The newsletter is now open access and anyone can read or download a pdf file of recent or past issues from the AWM website.

Lectures
The AWM sponsors three honorary lecture series.

 The Noether Lectures – honor women who "have made fundamental and sustained contributions to the mathematical sciences". Presented in association with the American Mathematical Society, the lecture is given at the annual Joint Mathematics Meetings.
 The Falconer Lectures – honor women who "have made distinguished contributions to the mathematical sciences or mathematics education. Presented in association with the Mathematical Association of America, the lecture is given at the annual MathFest.
 The Kovalevsky Lectures – honor women who have "made distinguished contributions in applied or computational mathematics". Presented in association with the Society for Industrial and Applied Mathematics (SIAM), the lecture is given at the SIAM Annual Meeting. The lecture series is named for the mathematician Sonia Kovalevsky.

Awards
The AWM sponsors several awards and prizes.

 Alice T. Schafer Prize – given each year "to an undergraduate woman for excellence in mathematics".
 Louise Hay Award – given each year for "outstanding achievements of a woman in mathematics education".
 M. Gweneth Humphreys Award – given each year for "outstanding mentorship activities of a woman in the mathematical sciences".
 Ruth I. Michler Memorial Prize – given each year to a woman recently tenured in mathematics.  The prize funds a semester in residence at Cornell University without teaching obligations.
 AWM Service Award - given each year to women helping to promote and support women in mathematics through exceptional voluntary service to the Association for Women in Mathematics.

Three recently created prizes for early-career women are also sponsored by the AWM.

 AWM-Birman Research Prize – given every other year beginning in 2015 for "exceptional research in topology/geometry".
 AWM-Microsoft Research Prize – given every other year beginning in 2014 for "exceptional research in algebra/number theory".
 AWM-Sadosky Research Prize – given every other year beginning in 2014 for "exceptional research in analysis".

The AWM Fellows program recognizes "individuals who have demonstrated a sustained commitment to the support and advancement of women in the mathematical sciences".

Presidents

 Mary W. Gray, 1971–1973
 Alice T. Schafer, 1973–1975
 Lenore Blum, 1975–1979
 Judith Roitman, 1979–1981
 Bhama Srinivasan, 1981–1983
 Linda Preiss Rothschild, 1983–1985
 Linda Keen, 1985–1987
 Rhonda Hughes, 1987–1989
 Jill P. Mesirov, 1989–1991
 Carol S. Wood, 1991–1993
 Cora Sadosky, 1993–1995
 Chuu-Lian Terng, 1995–1997
 Sylvia M. Wiegand, 1997–1999
 Jean E. Taylor, 1999–2001
 Suzanne Lenhart, 2001–2003
 Carolyn S. Gordon, 2003–2005
 Barbara Keyfitz, 2005–2007
 Cathy Kessel, 2007–2009
 Georgia Benkart, 2009–2011
 Jill Pipher, 2011–2013
 Ruth Charney, 2013–2015
 Kristin Lauter, 2015–2017
 Ami Radunskaya, 2017–2019
 Ruth Haas, 2019–2021
 Kathryn Leonard, 2021–2023
 Talitha Washington, 2023–2025

See also
 African Women in Mathematics Association
 European Women in Mathematics
 Femmes et Mathématiques
 List of women in mathematics

References

Further reading
 
  An expanded version appeared in parts in the AWM Newsletter

External links
 
 Association for Women in Mathematics records at the Sophia Smith Collection, Smith College Special Collections

 
Mathematical societies
Organizations established in 1971
Women in mathematics
Organizations for women in science and technology
Awards and prizes of the Association for Women in Mathematics
Fellows of the Association for Women in Mathematics
1971 establishments in the United States